Ryan Button (born March 26, 1991) is a Canadian-German professional ice hockey defenceman. He is currently a playing with Grizzlys Wolfsburg of the Deutsche Eishockey Liga (DEL). Button was selected by the Boston Bruins in the 3rd round (86th overall) of the 2009 NHL Entry Draft. He has dual citizenship between Canada and Germany with origins in Wuppertal, Germany.

Playing career
Button played major junior hockey in the Western Hockey League (WHL) with the Prince Albert Raiders and the Seattle Thunderbirds.

Button made his professional debut in the American Hockey League with the Providence Bruins during the 2010–11 season, and on May 4, 2011, the Boston Bruins signed Button to a three-year entry-level contract.

On July 4, 2013 a blockbuster trade took place between the Dallas Stars and Boston Bruins sending Loui Eriksson to Boston and Tyler Seguin to Dallas in a 7 player deal. Boston traded Button, Seguin, and Rich Peverley, to Dallas in exchange for Eriksson, Joe Morrow, Reilly Smith, and Matt Fraser.

After a season within the Stars organization, Button left at the expiry of his contract, to sign abroad with German team, Iserlohn Roosters of the DEL, on July 24, 2014. In the midst of the 2014–15 season, having adapted quickly to the German league, Button was signed to a two-year contract extension to remain with the Roosters on January 2, 2015.

At the completion of the 2016–17 season, his third with the Roosters, Button left as a free agent to sign a one-year deal with fellow German outfit, EHC München, on June 2, 2017. Button played two seasons with München capturing the DEL championship in the 2017–18 season.

On May 20, 2019, Button left München as a free agent to sign a two-year contract with his third DEL club, Grizzlys Wolfsburg.

Career statistics

Regular season and playoffs

International

References

External links

1991 births
Living people
Boston Bruins draft picks
Canadian expatriate ice hockey players in Germany
Canadian ice hockey defencemen
Idaho Steelheads (ECHL) players
Iserlohn Roosters players
EHC München players
Prince Albert Raiders players
Providence Bruins players
Reading Royals players
Seattle Thunderbirds players
South Carolina Stingrays players
Ice hockey people from Edmonton
Texas Stars players
Grizzlys Wolfsburg players